Televizioni Tojikiston, formerly known as Shabakai Yakum (meaning “Channel One”), is the national broadcaster of the Central Asian state of Tajikistan, headquartered in the capital city, Dushanbe. It began broadcasting on October 3, 1959.

History

Tajik Television was formed in 1959. The first programme aired by the station aired on October 3, 1959. The first programme consisted of a bilingual Tajik/Russian news bulletin followed by a movie, Light in the Mountains. The first words were spoken by Rafuat Abdusalomov.

24-hour broadcasts commenced in 2012. Most of the channel's schedule is made up of local content. External content (especially foreign movies) is aired in Russian.

In June 2016, the channel's current name was adopted.

On April 1, 2022, it was announced that it would be launched in HD quality, and it broadcasts programs, including films, series, and various programs, which were broadcast on the Iraqi satellite ShababSat on DMN.

Broadcast
Broadcasting is conducted throughout the territory of Tajikistan on meter waves. In other countries, the television channel is accessible through cable television and the Internet. The channel is owned by the Government of the Republic of Tajikistan and the state institution "Television Tajikistan".

References

External links
Official site

Television stations in Tajikistan
Publicly funded broadcasters
Mass media in Dushanbe
State media